Dehors Serge dehors (Lit. "Outside, Serge, Outside") is a Canadian documentary film, directed by Martin Fournier and Pier-Luc Latulippe and released in 2021. The film is a portrait of actor and comedian Serge Thériault, who has in recent years suffered from intense clinical depression and has barely left his home, as his friends and family try to lovingly guide him back out into the world.

The film premiered in November 2021 at the Montreal International Documentary Festival.

The film received three Prix Iris nominations at the 24th Quebec Cinema Awards in 2022, for Best Documentary Film, Best Cinematography in a Documentary (Ariel Méthot) and Best Editing in a Documentary (Jean-François Lord).

References

External links
 

2021 films
2021 documentary films
Canadian documentary films
Quebec films
Documentary films about mental health
Documentary films about comedy and comedians
Documentary films about actors
2020s Canadian films